Wilger Elías Saboya Shuña (born 21 December 1988) is a Peruvian footballer who plays as a midfielder for Bangladesh Premier League side Brothers Union.

Career statistics

Club

Notes

References

1988 births
Living people
Peruvian footballers
Peruvian expatriate footballers
Association football midfielders
Sport Loreto players
Peruvian Primera División players
Peruvian Segunda División players
Expatriate footballers in Bangladesh